Nimrod Ping (19 September 1947 - 3 July 2006) was a British architect, politician and gay activist in Brighton, East Sussex, England.

Biography

Early life
After attending the Royal Grammar School, High Wycombe from 1964 to 1966 he studied architecture at Cardiff University.

Career
As an architect, he designed a Sainsbury's supermarket in Lewes Road, Brighton.

Politics
Ping served as a councillor at Brighton Borough Council (now Brighton and Hove City Council) for eight years from 1991 to 1999. He became chairman of the council's planning committee and of its licensing committee. Thanks to his unusual name, he achieved national fame after the BBC Radio 2 presenter Terry Wogan used his name as scale against which to compare other interesting names.

He was one of the first openly gay councillors in Britain. He took part in Brighton's Pride events for a number of years. He convinced other councillors to allow gay clubs in Brighton to stay open after midnight.

He was diagnosed with hepatitis C in the late 1990s. He became known locally as the face of southern England's hepatitis C campaign.

Originally a Labour Party supporter, he joined the Green Party a few months before his death.

Death
Ping died of hepatitis-related liver failure in 2006. His funeral took place at St Margaret's Church in Rottingdean on 20 July 2006, where his gravestone reads '"Architect, Musician and Troublemaker"  Arrived late, left too early, d. 3 July 2006'.

References

2006 deaths
Alumni of the Welsh School of Architecture
Councillors in East Sussex
Deaths from hepatitis
Green Party politicians (UK)
Infectious disease deaths in England
Labour Party (UK) councillors
People educated at the Royal Grammar School, High Wycombe
Gay politicians
English LGBT politicians
Year of birth unknown
LGBT architects
Architects from Brighton
1947 births
Deaths from liver failure
20th-century LGBT people